Computer-generated usually refers to a sound or visual that has been created in whole or in part with the aid of computer software or computer hardware.

Computer-generated may refer to:
 Computer animation
 Computer art
 Computer graphics
 Computer-generated holography
 Computer-generated imagery (CGI)
 Computer-generated music